{{Speciesbox
| image = 
| image_caption = 
| display_parents = 5
| taxon = Pygmaeconus molaerivus
| extinct = 
| authority = (Dekkers, 2016)
| synonyms_ref = 
| synonyms = 
 Conus (Pseudolilliconus) molaerivus Dekkers, 2016
 Conus molaerivus Dekkers, 2016
}}Pygmaeconus molaerivus'' is a species of sea snail, a marine gastropod mollusk, in the family Conidae, the cone snails and their allies.

References

Conidae